Elizabethan Express is a 1954 British Transport Film that follows The Elizabethan, a non-stop British Railways service from London King's Cross to Edinburgh Waverley along the East Coast Main Line. Although originally intended as an advertising short, it now acts as a nostalgic record of the halcyon years of steam on British Railways and the ex LNER Class A4.

It was directed by Tony Thompson, with a tongue-in-cheek poetic commentary written by Paul Le Saux. It is also notable for its music by Clifton Parker, who also wrote the score for Blue Pullman and several other British Transport Films. He was later to write the music for the 1959 version of The Thirty-Nine Steps, which also features an A4.

Synopsis
The film follows the preparation behind the service, as well as focusing on one particular journey. The 'star' of the film is the Gresley A4 60017 Silver Fox, although the film makes a point of featuring many railway employees, for example the maintenance men, the driver and fireman and the station master at Waverley station "who has a very high sense of occasion".  The train completes its journey in its timetabled 6 hours 30 minutes.

It is still highly regarded for its well-filmed sequences by cinematographer Billy Williams showing the operation of the East Coast main line and the Gresley A4 as it was in mainline use, for example the water scoop and corridor tender, although the whimsical verse commentary dates the work considerably. The film also offers a social record of the different hierarchies existing within the railway, as well as the fashion and people in the 1950s, albeit in a romanticised portrayal.

Background
The Elizabethan was a daily non-stop service in celebration of the new 'Elizabethan' era of the early 1950s. Departure from both ends was in mid-morning, for a teatime arrival. It ran only during the summer months, including in 1953 and 1954. It was able to make the  journey from London to Edinburgh non-stop by using LNER Class A4 steam locomotives equipped with a corridor tender, enabling a change of crew en route.

At the time this was the longest scheduled non-stop railway journey in the world.

See also
 List of named passenger trains of the United Kingdom

References

External links
British Transport Films website

 
Screenshots from the film at the BTF website
Moving History website, including clips of the film 

British Transport Films
Films scored by Clifton Parker
1950s English-language films
British documentary films
1954 documentary films
British black-and-white films
1950s British films